The Roman Catholic Diocese of Palmas–Francisco Beltrão is a diocese located in the cities of Palmas & Francisco Beltrão in the Ecclesiastical province of Cascavel in Brazil.

History
 December 9, 1933: Established as Territorial Prelature of Palmas from the Diocese of Lages and Diocese of Ponta Grossa
 January 14, 1958: Promoted as Diocese of Palmas
 January 7, 1987: Renamed as Diocese of Palmas–Francisco Beltrão

Bishops

Ordinaries
Prelates of Palmas
 Bishop Carlos Eduardo de Sabóia Bandeira Melo, O.F.M. (13 December 1947 – 11 April 1958)

Bishops of Palmas
 Bishop Carlos Eduardo de Sabóia Bandeira Melo, O.F.M. (11 April 1958  – 7 February 1969)
 Bishop Agostinho José Sartori, O.F.M. Cap. (16 February 1970 – 7 January 1987)

Bishops of Palmas–Francisco Beltrão 
 Bishop Agostinho José Sartori, O.F.M. Cap. (7 January 1987 – 24 August 2005)
 Bishop José Antônio Peruzzo (24 August 2005 – 7 January 2015), appointed Archbishop of Curitiba, Parana
 Bishop Edgar Xavier Ertl, S.A.C. (27 April 2016 – present)

Auxiliary bishop
Luiz Vicente Bernetti, O.A.D. (1996-2005), appointed Bishop of Apucarana, Parana

Other priest of this diocese who became bishop
Geremias Steinmetz, appointed Bishop of Paranavaí, Parana in 2011

References

External links
 GCatholic.org
 Catholic Hierarchy
 Diocese website (Portuguese) 

Roman Catholic dioceses in Brazil
Palmas-Francisco Beltrao, Roman Catholic Diocese of
Christian organizations established in 1933
Roman Catholic dioceses and prelatures established in the 20th century
1933 establishments in Brazil
Francisco Beltrão